Bernhard Kohl (born 4 January 1982, in Vienna) is an Austrian former professional road bicycle racer and recognized climbing specialist. After the Gerolsteiner team announced they would not be in existence for the 2009 season, Kohl signed with UCI ProTeam  for three years. His biggest career achievements include becoming the Austrian national road race champion in 2006, finishing third place overall in the Dauphiné Libéré and winning the mountains classification in the 2008 Tour de France. He was 73 seconds behind winner Carlos Sastre at the completion of the event, finishing in third place in the General classification.

He was banned from the sport for two years after testing positive for performance-enhancing drugs in October 2008. On 25 May 2009, he announced his retirement from the sport, claiming that it is "impossible to win without doping" in international cycling.

Doping 
On 13 October 2008, L'Équipe announced that Kohl had tested positive for CERA (continuous erythropoitin receptor activator, a third-generation variant of erythropoietin, aka EPO) used during the Tour de France. On the 15th he admitted his drug use. His results were removed, but his third-place finish in the 2008 Tour and his first place in the mountains classification have not been remade. The next day, Silence–Lotto terminated Kohl's contract with the team. Several journalists had also nominated Kohl to receive the Austrian Sportspersonality of the year award, but he was removed from the contenders list. On 24 November 2008, Kohl was banned for two years by the Austrian anti-doping agency (NADA).

His ex-manager, Stefan Matschiner, was arrested on 31 March 2009 in Austria and charged with selling doping substances. Kohl stated that he was "not surprised" by the arrest.
In an exclusive interview with L'Équipe, the Austrian detailed how he "prepared" himself for the 2008 Tour and received blood transfusions from his manager during the event. The International Cycling Union 's (UCI) biological passport failed to prevent Kohl from practicing blood doping on a regular basis during his career, he said. "The top riders are so professional in their doping that they know very well they have to keep their blood values stable not to be detected".

Kohl's results for the 2008 Tour de France have been removed in the official Tour de France results, but the definitive classification has not been published yet.

Major results

2002
 1st  Road race, National Under-23 Road Championships
 1st Rund um den Henninger Turm Under-23
2004
 1st  Overall Tour des Pyrénées
 4th Circuit de Wallonie
2005
 7th Overall Tour of Austria
2006
 1st  Road race, National Road Championships
 3rd Overall Critérium du Dauphiné Libéré
 5th Overall Tour of Austria
2008
 3rd Overall Tour de France
1st  Mountains classification
 6th Overall Bayern Rundfahrt

References

External links 

Austrian male cyclists
Austrian sportspeople in doping cases
Doping cases in cycling
Living people
Cyclists from Vienna
1982 births